Valiabad (also Romanized as Valīābād and Walīābād) is a village in Jolgeh Rural District, in the Central District of Asadabad County, Hamadan Province, Iran. At the 2006 census, its population was 152, in 37 families.

References 

Populated places in Asadabad County